E. Santhosh Kumar is a Malayalam writer. He has won numerous awards, including Kerala Sahitya Academy.

Biography 

Galapagos, which was later published as a collection, was his first published short story. He won his first Kerala Sahitya Akademi Award in 2006 for Chavukali, a collection of short stories.  In 2012, he won the  Kerala Sahitya Akademi Award for the second time, for his novel Andhakaranazhi.

Notable works 
His first short stories were published in the late nineties and his first novel in 2002. He is generally identified with the generation of Malayalam writers who came into prominence at the turn of the 21st century. His oeuvre includes two full-length novels, six novelettes and over sixty short stories.

List of works

Novels 
 Amusement Park (2002) N B S kottayam
 Vaakkukal (2007) Mathrubhumi Books
 Kaakkaradesathe Urumbukal (2009) Kerala Balasahitya Institute
 Andhakaranazhi (2011) Mathrubhumi Books
 Island of Lost Shadows (English translation of Andhakaranazhi) 2015, Niyogi Books, New Delhi
 Jnanabharam (2020) Mathrubhumi books

Novellas
 Thankachan Manjakkaran(2009)
 Kunnukal Nakshathrangal (2014)
 Chidambara Rahasyam (2014), DC Books
 Three Novels (2015), DC Books
 Oralkku Ethra Mannu Veenam (2016), DC Books

Short story collections 
 Galapagos (2000)
 Moonnu Andhanmaar Aanaye Vivarikkunnu (2003)
 Chaavukali (2006)
 Moonnu Viralukal (2008)
 Neechavedam (2010)
 Kathakal: E Santhosh Kumar (2013) DC Books
 Ente Priyappetta Kathakal (2018) DC Books
  Narakangalude Upama (2019)  DC Books
  A fistful of Mustard Seeds (English translation of 12 stories) 2019 Niyogi Books, New Delhi
   Pasupatham (2021)  DC Books

Awards 

 Kerala Sahitya Akademi Award for Story (2006)
 Nooranad Haneef Memorial Novel Award (2012)
 Kerala Sahitya Akademi Award for Novel (2012)

References

External links 

 Nair, Ravisankar S (June 2014). "അദശയ സാനനിധയങങളിലടെ കഥ പറയനന നോവൽ". കലാപർണ: 6–14.
 വി.വിജയകമാർ (October 2019). പരതിബോധതതിനറെ അടയാളങങൾ. Kozhikode: ഐ ബകസ. pp. 21–22. ISBN 978-93-87828-28-5.
 Sankar V, Sucheta (December 2016). "Textual Exiles: Cartographies of Power in Amusement Park". Journal of Literature and Aesthetics. 16: 81–93.
 V. Vijayakumar (20 October 2017). "എനതാണ മനഷയമനസസിനോളം ദരഹമായിരികകനനത?". Indian Express Malayalam (in Malayalam). Retrieved 22 November 2019.
 V. Vijayakumar. കഥയിലിലലാതതത. Palakkad: ലോഗോസ ബകസ. pp. 22–53. ISBN 979-93-88364-13-3 Check |isbn= value: checksum (help).
 T.pillai, Meena (28 June 2018). "Eye for detail and nuances". The Hindu. ISSN 0971-751X. Retrieved 22 November 2019.

1969 births
Living people
Malayalam-language writers
Recipients of the Kerala Sahitya Akademi Award
People from Thrissur district